The Comeback Trail is a 2020 American crime comedy film directed by George Gallo and written by Gallo and Josh Posner, based on the 1982 film of the same name by Harry Hurwitz. It stars Robert De Niro, Tommy Lee Jones, Morgan Freeman, Zach Braff, Emile Hirsch, and Eddie Griffin.

The film premiered at the 2020 Monte-Carlo Comedy Film Festival. A 2023 U.S. theatrical release is planned by Cloudburst Entertainment.

Cast
 Robert De Niro as Max Barber, Walter's uncle
 Tommy Lee Jones as Duke Montana
 Morgan Freeman as Reggie Fontaine
 Kyron Bonner as Young Reggie Fontaine
 Zach Braff as Dr. Walter Creason, Max's nephew
 Eddie Griffin as Devin Wilton
 Emile Hirsch as James Moore
 Kate Katzman as Megan Albert
 Blerim Destani as Boris
 Sheryl Lee Ralph as Bess Jones
 Leslie Stratton as Sister Mary Lilith
 Nick Vallelonga as Mobster Boss
 Vito Di Donato as Mobster #4
 Joel Michaely as Andre

Production

The project was announced in May 2019, with Robert De Niro, Tommy Lee Jones and Morgan Freeman cast in the film, written and directed by George Gallo. Zach Braff and Eddie Griffin were added later that month. Emile Hirsch joined the next month.

Filming began in early June 2019 and continued to July throughout New Mexico.

Release
The Comeback Trail premiered at the 17th Monte-Carlo Comedy Film Festival on October 9, 2020. It was initially scheduled to be theatrically released in the United States on November 13, 2020, but was delayed to July 23, 2021, again to November 18, 2022 and then to 2023.

On June 19, 2021 the film was released through Sky Cinema on the Sky TV and Now TV platforms in the United Kingdom.

Reception
On Rotten Tomatoes, the film holds an approval rating of 30% based on 23 reviews, with an average rating of 5.2/10.

References

External links

 

2020 films
2020 comedy films
2020 crime films
2020s crime comedy films
American crime comedy films
Remakes of American films
2020s English-language films
Films directed by George Gallo
Films postponed due to the COVID-19 pandemic
Films set in 1974
Films shot in New Mexico
2020s American films